The Law Officers are the senior legal advisors to His Majesty's Government and devolved executives of the United Kingdom. They are variously referred to as the Attorney General, Solicitor General or Advocate General depending on seniority and geography - though other terms are also in use, such as the Counsel General for Wales. Law Officers in these roles are distinguished by being political appointees, while also being bound by the duties of independence, justice and confidentiality among the other typical professional commitments of lawyers. These roles do not have any direct oversight of prosecutions nor do they directly lead or influence criminal investigations. This is a distinguishing factor between Law Officers and the State Attorneys General of the United States or US Attorney General.

Each British Overseas Territory, apart from the British Indian Ocean Territory, also has its own Attorney General. Many Commonwealth countries or those with a history of British colonisation retain these titles, though their particular roles and responsibilities may differ from the roles in the United Kingdom. 

There are eight Law Offices in the United Kingdom, though not all serve the Westminster Government. The role of Attorney General for England and Wales and Advocate General for Northern Ireland are currently held by Rt Hon Victoria Prentis KC MP. She is supported by the Solicitor General for England and Wales. Following devolution, a new position of Advocate General for Scotland was created to advise the UK Government on matters of Scots law. The devolved Scottish executive also has two law officers, the Lord Advocate and the Solicitor General for Scotland. The Welsh Government has its own Law Officer: the Counsel General for Wales; as does the Northern Irish executive: the Attorney General for Northern Ireland. 

The two Attorneys General for the Duchies of Lancaster and Cornwall are non-political appointments. They are not typically being referred to when the term 'law officer' is used, as this tends to be reserved for political appointees.

Law Officers of the UK

England 

The Attorney General for England and Wales, a member of the UK Government, is similarly the chief law officer of the Crown in England and Wales and advises and represents the Crown and government departments in court. By convention, and unlike the papers of other ministers, this legal advice is available to subsequent governments. In the second half of the 20th century it became unusual for the Attorney General to be formally a member of the Cabinet. Rather he/she would attend only when the Cabinet required legal advice.

The Attorney General oversees the small Attorney General's Office and also has responsibility for the Government Legal Department, which is headed by the Treasury Solicitor. In practice, the Treasury Solicitor (who also has the title of Procurator General) normally provides the lawyers or briefs Treasury Counsel to appear in court, although the Attorney General may appear in person. The person appointed to this role provides legal advice to the Government, acts as the representative of the public interest and resolves issues between government departments. The Government Legal Department provides advice to Government Departments, instructing independent counsel where necessary.  The Attorney General is a barrister and can appear in court in person, though in practice he/she rarely does so, and then only in cases of outstanding national importance.  In those cases the Government Legal Department provides his back-up. When appearing in court in person he/she is addressed by the judge as "Mr Attorney".

The Attorney General also has supervisory powers over prosecutions, including those mounted by the Crown Prosecution Service, headed by the Director of Public Prosecutions; the Serious Fraud Office; and the Revenue and Customs Prosecutions Office. While the Attorney General is not personally involved with prosecutions, some prosecutions (e.g. riot) cannot be commenced without their consent, and they have the power to halt prosecutions generally. Criminal prosecutions are the responsibility of the Crown Prosecution Service, headed by the Director of Public Prosecutions. The Attorney General may appeal cases to the higher courts where, although the particular case is settled, there may be a point of law of public importance at issue.

The Attorney General has public interest functions, being, for example, the trustee of default where a sole trustee has died, and can also take cases to the Supreme Court where points of general legal importance need to be settled.

The Attorney General's deputy is the Solicitor General for England and Wales, currently Michael James Tomlinson-Mynors. Under the Law Officers Act 1997, the Solicitor General may do anything on behalf of, or in the place of, the Attorney General, and vice versa.

Wales 

Under the Government of Wales Act 2006, the Counsel General for Wales is the chief legal adviser to, and a member of, the Welsh Government.

Scotland 

Under the 1999 constitutional reforms brought about by the Scotland Act 1998, the Lord Advocate has become an officer of the Scottish Government, while the United Kingdom Government is advised on Scots law by the Advocate General for Scotland. The Lord Advocate, currently Dorothy Bain, heads the Crown Office and Procurator Fiscal Service and is the chief public prosecutor in Scotland. The Lord Advocate is assisted by the Solicitor General for Scotland, currently Ruth Charteris.

Northern Ireland 

Since the prorogation of the Parliament of Northern Ireland in 1972, the Attorney General for England and Wales was also Attorney General for Northern Ireland. The separate office of Attorney General for Northern Ireland was re-created alongside the new office of Advocate General for Northern Ireland upon the devolution of policing and justice powers to the Northern Ireland Assembly on 12 April 2010. As a result, these functions were split between:

 The Advocate General for Northern Ireland, who is the chief legal adviser to the UK Government on Northern Ireland law. The post is held by the Attorney General for England and Wales by virtue of office. 
 The Attorney General for Northern Ireland, who is the chief legal adviser to the Northern Ireland Executive. John Larkin QC was appointed to that position on 24 May 2010 by the First Minister of Northern Ireland and deputy First Minister of Northern Ireland, currently it is Brenda King since 18 August 2020.

Non-Political Attorneys General
Some subjects are entitled to have an attorney general: these include a queen consort and the Prince of Wales, who has an Attorney General for the Duchy of Cornwall. There is also an Attorney-General of the Duchy of Lancaster, which is a mostly landed inheritance that is held by the Crown (in trust for the monarch) and administered independently of the monarch under the supervision of a government minister, the Chancellor of the Duchy of Lancaster.

Defunct Legal Offices
Before the establishment of the Irish Free State in 1922, the legal advisers to the Crown in the Courts of Ireland were the Attorney-General for Ireland and the Solicitor-General for Ireland. These offices became redundant in 1921.

The Crown also had a legal adviser for the High Court of Admiralty, known as the Admiralty Advocate, but this office lapsed in 1875 when the Admiralty Court became part of the Probate, Divorce and Admiralty Division of the High Court of Justice.

The Crown's representative in the ecclesiastical courts of England was the King's Advocate (or Queen's Advocate when the monarch was female). This office has been vacant since the resignation of its last holder in 1872.

Current Law Officers of the Crown

Attorneys General of the British Overseas Territories

References

External links
Attorney General's Office

 
Law of the United Kingdom
Scots law formal titles
Legal ethics
Region-specific legal occupations